Mario Adolfo Búcaro Flores (born on 5 May 1977) is a Guatemalan diplomat and civil servant who has served as Minister of Foreign Affairs since 1 February 2022. Previously, he served as Guatemala Ambassador to Mexico, Israel, Bulgaria and Cyprus.

References

1977 births
Living people
Guatemalan diplomats
Ambassadors of Guatemala to Israel
Ambassadors of Guatemala to Mexico
Ambassadors of Guatemala to Bulgaria
Ambassadors of Guatemala to Cyprus
Rafael Landívar University alumni
Universidad de San Carlos de Guatemala alumni
University of Salamanca alumni
Foreign ministers of Guatemala